The 1980 Seiko Hong Kong Classic, also known as the Hong Kong Open, was a men's tennis tournament played on outdoor hard courts in Hong Kong that was part of the 1980 Grand Prix tennis circuit. It was the eighth edition of the event and was held from 3 November through 19 November 1980. Second-seeded Ivan Lendl won the singles title.

Finals

Singles
 Ivan Lendl defeated  Brian Teacher 5–7, 7–6(7–2), 6–3
 It was Lendl's 6th singles title of the year and of his career.

Doubles
 Ferdi Taygan /  Peter Fleming defeated  Bruce Manson /  Brian Teacher 7–5, 6–2

References

External links
 ITF tournament edition details

Viceroy Classic
1980 in Hong Kong
Tennis in Hong Kong